2006 was the ninth year of the Formula Palmer Audi open-wheel racing series. Briton Jon Barnes won the Championship, while American Dane Cameron took the Autumn Trophy

2006 Championship

The 2006 FPA Championship took in 15 rounds at six meetings. Brands Hatch was visited in both Indy and Grand Prix configurations, while Snetterton was added to the calendar and the series returned to Spa-Francorchamps. Two FIA GT Championship-supporting rounds at Dijon-Prenois in France and at Mugello in Italy concluded the season.

At the start of the season, Viktor Jensen, son of radio DJ David Jensen, romped away from the rest of the field, winning the first four races. But after that, having found his feet in his first year of open-wheel racing, Jon Barnes emerged as the dominant force, winning nine of the last 10 rounds to take the title with a race to spare. Barnes was nominated for the McLaren Autosport BRDC Award for his efforts throughout the season, breaking numerous FPA records such as most wins (nine), most consecutive wins (seven) and most points in a season (326).

2006 FPA Championship Schedule

2006 Championship Standings

Notes:
 0 denotes a finish outside the points.
 DNF denotes a failure to finish.
 A blank space denotes a non-participation, i.e. did not start.
 Bold denotes race winner.
 Ludovico Manfredi was not eligible to score championship points due to licence issues. However, the points he would have scored (51 in total, enough for 20th in the final standings) are shown in the table.

2006 Autumn Trophy

The 2006 Autumn Trophy, held on consecutive weekends at Snetterton and Brands Hatch in early November, heralded the dawn of the next generation of young FPA stars. At Snetterton, 16-year-old T Cars star Luciano Bacheta proved to be a contender, winning his very first race in an open-wheel car, and following it up with a third place and another victory to lead the series at the half-way stage. Meanwhile, Team USA Scholarship driver Dane Cameron won the second race to remain just two points behind Bacheta.

At Brands Hatch, however, Cameron put in a stunning weekend performance on a track the Californian had never driven before, winning all three races to become the third American to claim the title. Bacheta had to settle for third in the series, as the consistent Aaron Steele took the runner-up spot by virtue of podium finishes in all six races.

The Autumn Trophy was also notable for the open-wheel racing debuts of Alex Brundle, son of former Formula One driver Martin Brundle, and Stefan Wilson, brother of ChampCar star and former FPA champion Justin Wilson.

2006 Autumn Trophy Schedule

2006 Autumn Trophy Standings

Notes:
 0 denotes a finish outside the points.
 DNF denotes a failure to finish.
 A blank space denotes a non-participation, i.e. did not start.
 Bold denotes race winner.

Formula Palmer Audi
Formula Palmer Audi seasons
Palmer Audi